The 1927 Mississippi gubernatorial election took place on November 8, 1927, in order to elect the Governor of Mississippi. Incumbent Democrat Dennis Murphree, as he had not served a full term, was eligible for and ran for election. As was common at the time, the Democratic candidate ran unopposed in the general election so therefore the Democratic primary was the real contest, and winning the primary was considered tantamount to election.

Democratic primary
No candidate received a majority in the Democratic primary, which featured 4 contenders, so a runoff was held between the top two candidates. The runoff election was won by former Governor Theodore G. Bilbo, who defeated incumbent Governor Dennis Murphree.

Results

Runoff

General election
In the general election, Bilbo ran unopposed.

Results

References

1927
gubernatorial
Mississippi
November 1927 events